Maryland's Legislative District 5 is one of 47 districts in the state for the Maryland General Assembly. It covers part of Carroll County.

Demographic characteristics
As of the 2020 United States census, the district had a population of 131,865, of whom 103,299 (78.3%) were of voting age. The racial makeup of the district was 114,178 (86.6%) White, 4,795 (3.6%) African American, 311 (0.2%) Native American, 2,432 (1.8%) Asian, 49 (0.0%) Pacific Islander, 2,232 (1.7%) from some other race, and 7,878 (6.0%) from two or more races. Hispanic or Latino of any race were 5,648 (4.3%) of the population.

The district had 95,522 registered voters as of October 17, 2020, of whom 19,265 (20.2%) were registered as unaffiliated, 49,658 (52.0%) were registered as Republicans, 25,112 (26.3%) were registered as Democrats, and 800 (0.8%) were registered to other parties.

Political representation
The district is represented for the 2023–2027 legislative term in the State Senate by Justin D. Ready (R) and in the House of Delegates by April Rose (R), Christopher Bouchat (R) and Chris Tomlinson (R).

References

Carroll County, Maryland
05
05